Evans Osei (born 25 February 1997) is a Ghanaian football player who plays for Serie D club F.C. Giugliano 1928.

Club career
He made his professional debut in the Lega Pro for Juve Stabia on 28 September 2014 in a game against Reggina.

References

External links
 
 

1997 births
Footballers from Kumasi
Living people
Ghanaian footballers
Ghanaian expatriate footballers
S.S. Juve Stabia players
F.C. Pro Vercelli 1892 players
Bologna F.C. 1909 players
Torino F.C. players
A.S.D. Roccella players
S.S. Verbania Calcio players
Serie B players
Serie C players
Serie D players
Ghanaian expatriate sportspeople in Italy
Expatriate footballers in Italy
Association football midfielders